The Labour Party (A/Ap), formerly The Norwegian Labour Party (DNA), is a social-democratic political party in Norway. It is positioned on the centre-left of the political spectrum, and is led by Jonas Gahr Støre. It was the senior partner of the governing red–green coalition from 2005 to 2013, and its former leader Jens Stoltenberg served as the prime minister of Norway.

The Labour Party is officially committed to social-democratic ideals. Its slogan since the 1930s has been "everyone shall take part" and the party traditionally seeks a strong welfare state, funded through taxes and duties. Since the 1980s, the party has included more of the principles of a social market economy in its policy, allowing for privatisation of state-owned assets and services and reducing income tax progressivity, following the wave of economic liberalisation during the 1980s. During the first Stoltenberg government, the party's policies were inspired by Tony Blair's New Labour agenda in the United Kingdom and saw the most widespread privatisation by any government in Norway to that date. The party has frequently been described as increasingly neoliberal since the 1980s, both by political scientists and opponents on the political left. The Labour Party profiles itself as a progressive party that subscribes to co-operation on a national as well as international level.

Its youth wing is the Workers' Youth League. The party is a member of the Party of European Socialists and the Progressive Alliance. It was formerly member of the Comintern (1919–1923), the International Revolutionary Marxist Centre (1932–1935), the Labour and Socialist International (1938–1940), and the Socialist International (1951–2016). The Labour Party has always been a strong supporter of Norwegian NATO membership and has supported Norway joining the European Union during two referendums. During the Cold War, when the party was in government most of the time, the party closely aligned Norway with the United States at the international level and followed an anti-communist policy at the domestic level in the aftermath of the 1948 Kråkerøy speech and culminating in Norway becoming a founding member of NATO in 1949.

Founded in 1887, the party steadily increased in support until it became the largest party in Norway at the 1927 parliamentary election, a position it has held ever since. That year also saw the consolidation of conflicts surrounding the party during the 1920s following its membership in the Comintern. It first formed a government in 1928 and has led the government for all but sixteen years since 1935. From 1945 to 1961, the party had an absolute majority in the Norwegian Parliament, to date the last time this has happened in the history of Norway. The electoral domination by the Labour Party during the 1960s and early 1970s was initially broken by competition from smaller left-wing parties, primarily from the Socialist People's Party. From the late 1970s, the party started to lose voters due to a rise in right-wing parties, leading to a swing to the right for the Labour Party under Gro Harlem Brundtland during the 1980s. In 2001, the party achieved its worst results since 1924. Between 2005 and 2013, Labour returned to power after committing to a coalition agreement with other parties in order to form a majority government. Since losing nine seats in 2013, Labour has been in opposition. The party lost a further six seats in 2017, yielding the second-lowest number of seats Labour has held since 1924. At the 2021 election, the party lost one seat but left-wing opposition gained a majority over the political right, with Støre becoming the prime minister and heading a minority government along with the Centre Party.

History

Founding and early years 

The party was founded in 1887 in Arendal and first ran in elections to the Storting in 1894. It entered the parliament in 1903 and steadily increased its vote until 1927, when it became the largest party in Norway. The party were members of Communist International (Comintern), a communist organisation, between 1918 and 1923.

From the establishment of Vort Arbeide in 1884, the party had a growing and notable organisation of newspapers and other press outlets. The party press system eventually resulted in Norsk Arbeiderpresse (Norwegian Labour Press, now A-pressen). In January 1913, the party had 24 newspapers and six more newspapers were founded in 1913. The party also had the periodical Det 20de Aarhundre. In 1920, the party had 33 newspapers and 6 semi-affiliated newspapers. The party had its own publishing house, Det norske Arbeiderpartis forlag, succeeded by Tiden Norsk Forlag. In addition to books and pamphlets, Det norske Arbeiderpartis forlag published Maidagen (annual May Day publication), Arbeidets Jul (annual Christmas publication) and Arbeiderkalenderen (calendar). The party also published a monthly political magazine, Kontakt, between 1947 and 1954 which was edited by Torolf Elster.

From its roots as a radical alternative to the political establishment, the party grew to its current dominance through several eras. The party experienced a split in 1921 caused by a decision made two years earlier to join the Comintern and the Social Democratic Labour Party of Norway was formed. In 1923, the party left the Comintern while a significant minority of its members left the party to form the Communist Party of Norway. In 1927, the Social Democrats were reunited with Labour. Some Communists also joined Labour whereas other Communists tried a failed merger endeavor which culminated in the formation of the Arbeiderklassens Samlingsparti. The same year, Helga Karlsen became the party's first Member of Parliament.

In 1928, Christopher Hornsrud formed Labour's first government, but it lasted only two weeks. During the early 1930s, Labour abandoned its revolutionary profile and set a reformist course. Labour then returned to government in 1935 and remained in power throughout the Second World War. The party was a member of the Labour and Socialist International between 1938 and 1940. When Norway was invaded by Nazi Germany in 1940, the Labour-led government and the Norwegian royal family fled to London, whence it led a government-in-exile for the duration of the war.

Post-war period 
Immediately following the end of the Second World War, the Labour Party emerged victorious from the 1945 Norwegian parliamentary election. For the first time, the party secured an absolute majority in the Storting, taking 76 of 150 seats. Einar Gerhardsen of the Labour Party subsequently formed his first government, and he went on to dominate the post-war political scene over the following years. Gerhardsen is commonly referred to as Landsfaderen (Father of the Nation) and is generally considered one of the principal architects behind the reconstruction of Norway after the Second World War. The period from 1945 has been described as the golden age of the Norwegian Labour Party, and the party retained its parliamentary majority until the 1961 election. In 1963, the Kings Bay Affair drove the opposition to table a motion of no-confidence against the Gerhardsen's cabinet; the motion was ultimately successful, and Labour was forced to step down from government for the first time in 28 years. However, the incoming centre-right coalition proved short-lived, and Labour returned to government less than one month later, and remained in office until 1965.

The Labour Party later formed government in the periods of 1971–1972, 1973–1981, 1986–1989, and 1990–1997. Labour prime ministers in this period included party veterans Oscar Torp, Trygve Bratteli, and Gro Harlem Brundtland, and the party remained the largest in Norway throughout the remainder of the 20th century.

21st century 

In the year 2000, the centre-right coalition led by Kjell Magne Bondevik of the Christian Democrats was toppled in a confidence vote, and the Labour Party returned to power under Jens Stoltenberg, who became prime minister. However, after a period of intense infighting between Stoltenberg and former prime minister Thorbjørn Jagland, and a turbulent spell in government, the party collapsed to only 24.3% of the vote in the 2001 Norwegian parliamentary election, marking its worst result since 1924. The party returned to the opposition under Stoltenberg's leadership, before later recovering to 32.7% in the 2005 Norwegian parliamentary election. The Labour Party subsequently formed its first ever peace-time coalition government along with the Socialist Left and Centre parties. Their cooperation was dubbed the Red-green coalition, in emulation of similar constellations in Germany.

In 2011, the party changed its official name from the Norwegian Labour Party (Det norske arbeiderparti) to the Labour Party (Arbeiderpartiet). The party claimed there had been confusion among voters at polling stations because of the difference between the official name and the common use name of Labour Party. The name change caused Arbeiderpartiet to appear on the ballot, eliminating any potential confusion. On 22 July 2011, a terrorist opened fire at the Labour Party's youth camp (ages 13–25), killing 69 people and killing eight more in Oslo with a bomb towards a government building (which was led by the Labour Party). Stoltenberg's initial response to the 22 July attack was well received by the Norwegian public. As he reaffirmed his government's commitment to the values of openness and tolerance in the face of adversity or intolerance his approval rating soared as high as 94%, only to decrease sharply after the  22 July Commission report highlighted the laggard response time of police cost dozens of lives.

In the 2013 Norwegian parliamentary election, the Red-green coalition lost its majority in the Storting, but the Labour Party remained the largest party in the Storting. Jens Stoltenberg, who had served as prime minister for 10 of the past 13 years, remained party leader until he stepped down in 2014 after being appointed Secretary General of NATO. Later, Jonas Gahr Støre, a prominent profile in the Stoltenberg government, was chosen as new party leader on 14 June 2014. In the 2017 Norwegian parliamentary election, he led the party to a surprise defeat, as Labour fell 3.4 perentage points to 27.4%, and from 55 to 49 seats in the Storting, while the Conservative Party managed to retain a majority along with its smaller centre-right partners. Erna Solberg, Conservative prime minister since 2013, remained in office throughout the 2017—2021 term. In the same year, the Labour Party was targeted by hackers suspected to be from Russia.
 
In 2021, the Labour Party returned to government after eight years in opposition, following the 2021 Norwegian parliamentary election. The party dropped to 48 seats from the 49 it had secured in 2017, but its centre-left coalition secured a landslide victory overall, taking 100 of the 169 seats in the Storting. The energy crisis was the most important issue for voters. Party leader Jonas Gahr Støre assumed the Norwegian premiership on 14 October 2021, at the helm of a minority coalition with the Centre Party. Soon after assuming power, the new coalition was faced with a series of crises, including the Russian invasion of Ukraine and subsequent energy price hikes. The government was criticized for its handling of these crises, and by August 2022, Støre had dropped to 31% in preferred prime minister polling, against 49% for Erna Solberg, the Conservative prime minister in the 2013—2021 period. Meanwhile, the Labour Party hit record-low ratings in voting intention polls in late 2022, with a number of polls placing it below the 20%-mark in September 2022.

Organisation 
The Labour Party organisation is divided into county- and municipality-level chapters, numbering approximately 2,500 associations in total. Historically, the party has maintained a close association with the Norwegian Confederation of Trade Unions (LO), and until the mid-1990s, a dual-membership agreement existed between the two organizations, with LO members automatically holding membership in the Labour Party as well. The party had about 200,500 members at its peak in 1950. The dual-membership clause was scrapped in 1995, and that year its membership level fell to just over 72,500 from 128,000 in 1990. In 2021, the party comprised 45,553 members according to its own official website. Since 2005, the party has maintained a policy requiring full gender parity at every level of organisation above ordinary membership.

The supreme body of the party is the Party Congress which is held every two years. The most senior body between these congresses is the National Delegate's Meeting which is made up of the party's Executive Board and two delegates from each of the 19 counties. The Executive Board itself consists of 16 elected members as well as the leadership of the party. The party is headed by a single leader, while the number of deputy leaders has fluctuated between one and two in different periods. As of 2022, the party leadership is made up of leader Jonas Gahr Støre, who has held the position since 2014, and deputy leader Bjørnar Selnes Skjæran, who was first elected to the position in 2021.

The party's youth organisation is the Workers' Youth League, and it maintains a women's wing known as the Labour Party Women's Network. The party participates in elections to the Sami Parliament of Norway, and work related to this has its own organisational structure with seven local groups, a bi-yearly congress, a national council and the Labour group in the Sami parliament.

Prominent party members

Party leaders

Labour Party prime ministers 
 Christopher Hornsrud (January–February 1928)
 Johan Nygaardsvold (1935–1945)
 Einar Gerhardsen (1945–1951)
 Oscar Torp (1951–1955)
 Einar Gerhardsen (1955–1963), (1963–1965) 
 Trygve Bratteli (1971–1972, 1973–1976)
 Odvar Nordli (1976–1981)
 Gro Harlem Brundtland (February–October 1981, 1986–1989, 1990–1996)
 Thorbjørn Jagland (1996–1997)
 Jens Stoltenberg (2000–2001, 2005–2013)
 Jonas Gahr Støre (2021–present)

Electoral results

Graphical summary

Parliamentary elections

Notes

References

External links 

 Arbeiderpartiet – official website 
 Norwegian Labour Party – official website  
 Election results for the Labour Party in the 2011 local elections

 
1887 establishments in Norway
Norway
Members of the Labour and Socialist International
Party of European Socialists member parties
Political parties established in 1887
Progressive Alliance
Second International
Centre-left parties in Europe
Socialist parties in Norway
Social democratic parties in Europe